Karakul, Qarokul  (Kyrgyz for "black lake", replacing the older Tajik name Siob; ; ; ,) is a  diameter lake within a rather large  impact crater. It is located in the Tajik National Park in the Pamir Mountains in Tajikistan.

Impact crater
Some estimates give its age as relatively recent. Preliminarily, it was thought to be c. 25 Ma or less than 23 Ma. However, it may even be from the recent Pliocene (5.3 to 2.6 Ma). The Earth Impact Database (EID) also lists it as younger than 5 Ma. It is larger than the Eltanin impact (2.5 Ma), which has already been suggested as a contributor to the cooling and ice cap formation in the Northern Hemisphere during the late Pliocene.

The Karakul impact structure was first identified around 1987 through studies of imagery taken from space.

Lake description

It is endorheic (lacking a drainage outlet) and the water is brackish. There is a small village with the same name on the eastern shore of the lake.

The lake level was 35 m higher after the last ice age.

Environment
Although the lake lies within a national park, much of the surroundings are used as pasture.  The lake, with its islands, marshes, wet meadows, peat bogs, and pebbly and sandy plains, has been identified by BirdLife International as an Important Bird Area (IBA) because it supports significant numbers of the populations of various bird species, either as residents, or as breeding or passage migrants. 

These species include bar-headed geese, ruddy shelducks, common mergansers, saker falcons, Himalayan vultures, lesser sand plovers, brown-headed gulls, Tibetan sandgrouse, yellow-billed choughs, Himalayan rubythroats, white-winged redstarts, white-winged snowfinches, rufous-streaked accentors, brown accentors, black-headed mountain finches and Caucasian great rosefinches. The lake's islands are the main places where waterbirds rest and nest.  

The only fish in the lake are Nemacheilus.

Events
Higher than Lake Titicaca, Karakul hosted the Roof of the World Regatta from 2014 to 2017. This replaced the Alpine Bank Dillon Open, held on the Dillon Reservoir in Colorado, United States as the highest sailing regatta in the world.

References 

Lakes of Tajikistan
Impact craters of Tajikistan
Impact crater lakes
Neogene impact craters
Pliocene Asia
Gorno-Badakhshan Autonomous Region
Important Bird Areas of Tajikistan
Ramsar sites in Tajikistan